Friedrich Delitzsch (3 September 1850 – 19 December 1922) was a German Assyriologist. He was the son of Lutheran theologian Franz Delitzsch (1813–1890).

Born in Erlangen, he studied in Leipzig and Berlin, gaining his habilitation in 1874 as a lecturer of Semitic languages and Assyriology in Leipzig. In 1885 he became a full professor at Leipzig, afterwards serving as a professor at the Universities of Breslau (1893) and Berlin (1899).

He was co-founder of the Deutsche Orient-Gesellschaft (German Oriental Society) and director of the Vorderasiatische Abteilung (Near Eastern Department) of the Royal Museums.

Bible-Babel Controversy

Friedrich Delitzsch specialized in the study of ancient Middle Eastern languages, and published numerous works on Assyrian language, history and culture. He is remembered today for his scholarly critique of the Old Testament. In a 1902 controversial lecture titled "Babel and Bible", Delitzsch maintained that many Old Testament writings were borrowed from ancient Babylonian tales, including the Genesis creation narrative and the Genesis flood narrative. During the following years there were several translations and modified versions of the "Babel and Bible". In the early 1920s, Delitzsch published the two-part Die große Täuschung (The Great Deception), which was a critical treatise on the book of Psalms, prophets of the Old Testament, the invasion of Canaan, etc. Delitzsch also stridently questioned the historical accuracy of the Hebrew Bible and placed great emphasis on its numerous examples of immorality (see also Julius Wellhausen).

Influence and legacy
Although Delitzsch's proposal to replace the Old Testament with German myths did not extend to this revision, his student Paul Haupt was one of the major advocates of the thesis of the Aryan Jesus.

In 1904, he was elected as a member of the American Philosophical Society.

Works

References 

 Book Rags; Friedrich and Franz Delitzsch

Further reading

External links
 
 

1850 births
1922 deaths
19th-century German Protestant theologians
20th-century German Protestant theologians
German Assyriologists
German Lutheran theologians
German scholars
Academic staff of the Humboldt University of Berlin
Leipzig University alumni
Academic staff of Leipzig University
People from Erlangen
People from the Kingdom of Bavaria
Academic staff of the University of Breslau
19th-century German male writers
19th-century German writers
Paleolinguists
Linguists of Indo-Semitic languages
German male non-fiction writers
Members of the American Philosophical Society